Abe Cabinet may refer to:

 Nobuyuki Abe Cabinet (1939–1940)
 First Abe Cabinet (2006–2007)
 Second Abe Cabinet (2012–2014)
 Third Abe Cabinet (2014–2017)
 Fourth Abe Cabinet (2017–2020)